This is a list of cities in Donetsk Oblast, Ukraine.

Cities in Donetsk Oblast

  Amvrosiivka 
  Avdiivka 
  Bakhmut 
  Bilozerske 
  Bilytske 
  Chasiv Yar 
  Debaltseve 
  Dobropillia 
  Dokuchaievsk 
  Donetsk 
  Druzhkivka 
  Hirnyk 
  Horlivka 
  Ilovaisk 
  Khartsyzk 
  Kirovske, Donetsk Oblast 
  Komsomolske 
  Kostiantynivka 
  Kramatorsk 
  Krasnohorivka 
  Kurakhove 
  Lyman 
  Makiivka 
  Marinka, Ukraine 
  Mariupol 
  Mospyne 
  Mykolaivka, Donetsk Oblast 
  Myrnohrad 
  Novoazovsk 
  Novohrodivka 
  Pokrovsk 
  Rodynske 
  Selydove 
  Shakhtarsk 
  Siversk 
  Sloviansk 
  Snizhne 
  Soledar 
  Sviatohirsk 
  Svitlodarsk 
  Toretsk 
  Torez 
  Ukrainsk 
  Volnovakha 
  Vuhledar 
  Vuhlehirsk 
  Yasynuvata 
  Yenakiieve 
  Yunokomunarivsk 
  Zalizne 
  Zhdanivka 
  Zuhres

See also
 List of cities in Ukraine

References

Donetsk Oblast